Milea: Suara dari Dilan (also known as simply Milea) is an Indonesian language 2020 romantic drama film directed by Fajar Bustomi and Pidi Baiq, and written by Baiq  and Titien Wattimena. The film is based on the novel of the same name by Baiq and is the sequel to Dilan 1991 released in 2019. The film is a spin-off, having its point of view from Dilan and displaying events uncaptured in the previous two films. The film was distributed to Netflix on 13 June 2020, and premiered on SCTV on 25 August 2020.

Plot 
In 1970s Bandung, Dilan is born to head teacher Punja Kusuma and soldier Ichal Kusuma. When he is a child, he wishes to marry someone. The Kusumas are a victim of domestic abuse, driving Dilan to be part of a motorbike gang in his school. He sees Milea one day, and start falling in love with her, leaving his girlfriend Susi. After a set of challenges, he officially becomes Milea's boyfriend.

Days later, Dilan is beaten up by an unknown gang at a warung. He plots revenge but is caught by Milea. He fails to take Milea's lecture seriously when he sees Milea with a man, who he later finds out is her cousin, Yugo. The attack, however, is foiled by the cops. One day, Milea and Dilan break up as Milea is tired of Dilan seemingly insistful on staying with his gang even after one of his close friends Akew is presumably killed by them. However, it is later revealed that the death was not caused by a gang attack.

Dilan hears that Milea is in a relationship with a guy named Gunar; envious, he tells his friend Piyan to fake that he already has a new girlfriend. Dilan reflects on what he once said, "If anyone hurts you, they must be gone", concluding, "If I hurt her, I must be gone too." He later moves to Yogyakarta for college. After graduating in August 1994, his father dies of cancer. He briefly sees Milea at the funeral. He then moves to Jakarta, starting adulthood.

In September 1997, Dilan meets Milea and her husband Herdi at the building the three work in. Former teacher Ms. Rini dies, and the school organizes a reunion. Later, the two call and talked about high school moments; Milea clarifies that she was never dating Gunar. After expressing farewell, Dilan rides his motorbike on the road both drove at after they started dating, reflecting on his failed wish to marry her.

Cast 

 Iqbaal Ramadhan as Dilan
 Bima Azriel as Young Dilan
 Vanesha Prescilla as Milea
 Makayla Rose Hilli as Young Milea (uncredited)
 Ira Wibowo as Dilan's mother
 Bucek Depp as Dilan's father
 Happy Salma as Milea's mother
 Farhan as Milea's father
 Adhisty Zara as Disa
 Yoriko Angeline as Wati
 Debo Andryos as Nandan
 Zulfa Maharani as Rani
 Gusti Rayhan as Akew
 Omara Esteghlal as Piyan
 Giulio Parengkuan as Anhar
 Andovi da Lopez as Herdi
 Jerome Kurnia as Yugo
 Tike Priatnakusumah as Aunt Eem

Release 
Milea: Suara dari Dilan premiered theatrically on 13 February 2020, in correspondence with Kajeng Kliwon.

Marketing 
The poster and trailer was unveiled on 9 December 2019. Two days later, the film's trailer reportedly became the most-viewed video in the Indonesian YouTube data. Marketing was also done on Jakarta's trains, which was then cancelled by Iqbaal due to the guilt of making passengers uncomfortable.

Reception 
Reflecting from the reception of the two previous films, producer Ody Mulya Hidayat hypothesized that the film will be the first Indonesian film to reach 7 million views theatrically, meaning it would be screened in 1,000 to 1,500 theaters in its opening.

Box office 
Milea: Suara dari Dilan receives more than 400,000 views in its opening day, making it the second most-viewed films in Indonesian film history. Milea: Suara dari Dilan beat Warkop DKI Reborn: Jangkrik Boss! Part 2 (313,623 viewers), in which it is now in third place. The fourth place is owned by Warkop DKI Reborn: Jangkrik Boss! Part 1 (270,000 views). Other than that, Danur 3: Sunyaruri is the fifth with 251,157 views. In three days, the film received 1.2 million views. The numbers attracted the eyes of Minister of Tourism and Creative Economy., Wishnutama. Via his Instagram account, Wishnutama congratulated the achievement Milea: Suara dari Dilan achieved. The number of viewers Milea: Suara dari Dilan received by its fourth day is around 1,627,750, making it the second trendiest Indonesian film. It beat Akhir Kisah Cinta Si Doel, in which the film has more than 1.15 million views. Milea: Suara dari Dilan is now in the same rank with Nanti Kita Cerita tentang Hari Ini in terms of box office. Via the film's official Twitter account, the numbers in its 'opening weekend' were the second highest. Milea: Suara dari Dilan now grossed 65.11 billion rupiah. In just a week, Milea: Suara dari Dilan received more than 2 million views, and is 2020's second trendiest film in terms of views. Milea: Suara dari Dilan is predicted to beat Nanti Kita Cerita tentang Hari Ini by Angga Dwimas Sasongko. The film is among the 15 films played since early January to late February. Viewers of Milea: Suara dari Dilan is still slightly lower than Danur 3: Sunyaruri (2,411,036) dan Dua Garis Biru (2,538,473), as well asImperfect: Karier, Cinta &amp; Timbangan (2,662,356). In its tenth day of screening, more than 2.7 million people viewed it, and achieved more than 3 million views in its 18th day. Milea: Suara dari Dilan's achievements has been predicted by the film crew before. The revenue made from the viewers of Milea: Suara Dari Dilan will increase but its exact number will be unknown, especially with it succeeding Dilan 1990 (6.3 million) and Dilan 1991 (5.25 million).

Accolades

Sequel possibility 
Due to Anchika, Dilan's girlfriend after his breakup with Milea, is not included in the film, Fajar opened up the possibility of the series coming back with another sequel, but its crew has not yet assembled.

References

External links  
 

Indonesian sequel films
Films based on Indonesian novels
2020 films
2020 romantic drama films
Indonesian high school films
Films set in 1980
Films set in 1994
Films set in 1997
2020s high school films
2020s Indonesian-language films
Films directed by Fajar Bustomi
Films directed by Pidi Baiq